The Pawsey Medal is awarded annually by the Australian Academy of Science to recognize outstanding research in the physics by an Australian scientist early in their career (up to 10 years post-PhD).

This medal commemorates the work of the late Joseph L. Pawsey, FAA.

Winners
Source:

See also

 List of physics awards

Notes

External links
 Pawsey Medal site of the Australian Academy of Science

Physics awards
Awards established in 1967
Australian Academy of Science Awards
Australian science and technology awards